The Coso Formation is a geologic formation in the Coso Range of the Mojave Desert, in Inyo County, California.

It preserves fossils dating back to the Neogene period. It yields fossil remains of many species of mammals, including of Equus simplicidens, the Hagerman Horse.

See also

 
 List of fossiliferous stratigraphic units in California
 Paleontology in California

References

 

Neogene California
Geology of Inyo County, California
Natural history of the Mojave Desert
Geologic formations of California